<onlyinclude>

August 2022

See also

References

killings by law enforcement officers
 08